Godwin Odiye (born 17 April 1956) is a former Nigeria international football defender.

Life
Odiye was born in Lagos in April 1956 to the family of Jonah and Cecilia Odiye. He attended St Paul's School, Ebute Metta, Eko Boys and then attended St Finbarr's, Akoka. He played football at both his primary and secondary schools. At St Finbarrs, he started out as a left-half back. In 1975, he was called to play for a junior team called the Nigerian  Academicals. The team beat Ghana in 1975 giving Odiye attention among scouts.

Odiye began playing club football in Nigeria for third division league side, Nestle and later National Bank of Lagos. While playing for National Bank, Odiye also worked with the bank as a clerk. He worked in the morning and trained in the evening. In 1978, Odiye was recruited by University of San Francisco to play collegiate soccer. Odiye moved to the United States to attend college and after graduating in 1983, he played for a local semi-professional club Greek-American A.C. which he would help win the 1985 and 1994 U.S. Open Cup.

Odiye made several appearances for the senior Nigeria national football team, including FIFA World Cup qualifying matches, and played at the 1976 and 1980 African Cup of Nations finals. He is well known for scoring an own goal in a 1978 FIFA World Cup qualifying match against Tunisia.

In September 2003, Godwin began working at the College Preparatory School in Oakland, CA as a teacher of a Recreation, Health, & Fitness class.

References

External links

Bio at College-Prep.org

1956 births
Africa Cup of Nations-winning players
Living people
Nigerian footballers
Nigerian expatriate footballers
Nigeria international footballers
1976 African Cup of Nations players
1980 African Cup of Nations players
Expatriate soccer players in the United States
Nigerian expatriate sportspeople in the United States
San Francisco Dons men's soccer players
San Francisco Greek-American A.C. players
Association football defenders
African Games silver medalists for Nigeria
African Games medalists in football
Competitors at the 1978 All-Africa Games